Hampton Rocks Cutting is a 1.3 hectare geological Site of Special Scientific Interest near the village of Bathampton, Somerset, notified in 1990.

The site is listed in the Geological Conservation Review, for its exposure of Pleistocene rocks made up of coarse fluvial gravels showing scour-and-fill structures and planar bedding. Their sedimentology gives a clear indication that the deposits were laid down under 'cold-stage' conditions, probably during the Devensian glacial period.

References

Sites of Special Scientific Interest in Avon
Bath and North East Somerset
Sites of Special Scientific Interest notified in 1990